Giuseppe Nuvolone (1619–1703) was an Italian painter of the Baroque period, active mainly in Milan, Brescia, and Cremona. Born in San Gimignano. He was the brother of the painter Carlo Francesco Nuvolone and son and pupil of Panfilo. He painted St Dominic resurrecting the dead for the church of San Domenico in Cremona.

References

1619 births
1703 deaths
Painters from Milan
17th-century Italian painters
Italian male painters
18th-century Italian painters
Italian Baroque painters
18th-century Italian male artists